Alan Shiell (born 25 April 1945) is a former Australian cricketer and newspaper reporter. He played in twenty-three first-class matches for South Australia between 1964 and 1967 before becoming a cricket reporter for the Adelaide-based The News.

See also
 List of South Australian representative cricketers

References

Sources
 Sexton, M. (2017) Chappell's Last Stand, Affirm Press: Melbourne.

External links
 

1945 births
Living people
Australian cricketers
South Australia cricketers
Cricketers from Adelaide